In the United States, a Shot Crew, officially known as an Interagency Hotshot Crew (IHC), is a team of 20-22 elite operators which mainly responds to large, high-priority fires across the country and abroad. They are assigned to work the most challenging parts of the fire and are considered strategic and tactical experts. Hotshots are a National Resource and their deployment is tightly controlled at the National Level. Hotshot crews are one of  the most highly trained, skilled and experienced type of wild land firefighters. They are qualified to provide leadership for initial-attack and extended-attack on wildland fires. Hotshots are trained and equipped to work in remote areas for extended periods of time with minimal logistical support. They are organized by agencies such as the United States Forest Service, National Park Service, Bureau of Indian Affairs, Bureau of Land Management, and state/county agencies; the National Interagency Fire Center coordinates hotshot crews on the federal level.

History 
Prior to the 1930s, wildland firefighting crews were organized on an "as-needed" basis, hiring firefighters without any formal experience or training. The Civilian Conservation Corps, which operated from 1933 until 1942, was a work relief program that employed young men primarily in natural resource conservation projects. CCC members were also utilized for fire suppression operations, however, marking the first time that standing crews had been established for that purpose.

At least one of the first crews carrying the name of "hotshots" originated out of a former CCC camp in the San Bernardino National Forest in Southern California. Conflicting sources report the first hotshot crews as starting in 1946 (Del Rosa and Los Padres Hotshots) or 1947 (Del Rosa and El Cariso Hotshots). In 1961, the Inter-Regional Fire Suppression (IRFS) program was developed, establishing six 30-man crews across the Western United States. These IRFS crews were stationed near airports for quick transportation to high-priority fires. Due to their effectiveness and value in fire management, the program expanded to 19 IRFS crews by 1974.

In 1980, the term interagency hotshot crew was adopted by IRFS crews. In the mid-1990s, an Interagency Hotshot Crew Operations Guide was developed to standardize the training, qualifications and responsibilities of hotshot crews. As of 2018 there are 113 hotshot crews across the nation.

Operations 

A hotshot crew consists of approximately 20–22 members, led by a minimum of one superintendent, one or two assistant superintendents, two or three squad leaders, and two senior firefighters.

Hotshot crews are proficient in a range of fire suppression tactics. Like other handcrews, IHCs are primarily tasked with constructing, firing out and holding firebreaks, through the use of chainsaws, hand tools, ignition devices and water delivery equipment. Hotshot crews can engage in all phases of wildfire response, from initial attack to mop-up. They are also trained in specialized operations, such as hot spotting, spot fire attack, tree felling and structure protection.

In order to effectively perform their duties, hotshot crews must maintain a high level of physical fitness. Aerobic fitness  is correlated with the time it takes to reach a safety zone. The minimum physical fitness standards for hotshots set by the National Wildfire Coordinating Group are: a 3-mile hike carrying a 60-pound pack in under 90 minutes, one and a half-mile run in 10:30 or less, 25 push-ups in 60 seconds, 45 sit-ups in 60 seconds and 7 pull-ups. These are the bare minimum requirements prescribed by policy and most operators far exceed these requirements.

While not fighting fires, hotshot crews typically work on their host units to meet resource goals such as thinning, prescribed fire operations, forest improvement, and trail construction projects. Hotshot crews can also respond to other emergency incidents, including search and rescue and disaster response. In 2010, the Cherokee IHC was assigned to clear trees downed by rare tornadoes in Prospect Park and Kissena Park in New York City, their first deployment to an urban setting.

Fatal accidents

On November 1, 1966, the El Cariso hotshot crew were trapped by flames in the Loop Fire as they worked on a steep hillside in Pacoima Canyon in Angeles National Forest. An unanticipated upslope wind came up in the afternoon and a spot fire was fanned and funneled up the steep canyon. The crew were cutting handline downhill and most of the crew were unable to reach safety in the few seconds they had. Ten members of the crew died on the Loop Fire that day, and another two members died from burn injuries in the following days. Most of the 19 El Cariso crew members who survived were critically burned and remained hospitalized for some time. The Downhill Indirect Checklist, improved firefighting equipment and better fire-behavior training all resulted, in part, from the lives lost on this fire.

On July 6, 1994, nine members of a hotshot crew based in Prineville, Oregon, died after being overtaken by the fast-moving South Canyon Fire on Storm King Mountain west of Glenwood Springs, Colorado. Five other firefighters, three smokejumpers and two helitack firefighters, also died in the incident.

On June 30, 2013, nineteen members of the Granite Mountain Hotshots perished in the Yarnell Hill Fire near Yarnell, Arizona. Nineteen of the twenty members of the crew were killed when their escape route was cut off by an approaching fire. All of the entrapped members of the Granite Mountain Hotshots deployed their fire shelters. The incident was made into a film, Only the Brave.

See also
Fire use module
 Smokejumper
 Wildland fire engine
 Wildland fire suppression

References

External links 

 Index of all Hotshot Crews
 Wildfire Management: Hotshot Crews Congressional Research Service

Forestry occupations
Wildfire suppression